Slavonic-Serbian (славяносербскій, slavjanoserbskij), Slavo-Serbian, or Slaveno-Serbian (славено-сербскiй, slaveno-serbskij; /slavenosrpski) was a literary language used by the Serbs in the Habsburg Empire, mostly in what is now Vojvodina, from the mid-18th century to the first decades of the 19th century, falling into obscurity by the 1870's. It was a linguistic blend of Church Slavonic of the Russian recension, vernacular Serbian (Shtokavian dialect), and Church Slavonic of the Serbian recension, with varying sources and differing attempts at standardisation.

History
At the beginning of the 18th century, the literary language of the Serbs was the Serbian recension of Church Slavonic (also called Serbo-Slavonic), with centuries-old tradition. After the Great Serb Migration of 1690, many Serbs left Ottoman-held territories and settled in southern areas of the Kingdom of Hungary in the Habsburg Empire, mostly in what is now Vojvodina. The Serbian Orthodox Church in these areas was in need of liturgical books, and the Serbian schools were in need of textbooks. The Habsburg court, however, did not allow the Serbs to establish their printing presses. The Serbian Church and schools received ample help in books and teachers from the Russian Empire. By the mid-18th century, Serbo-Slavonic had been mostly replaced with Russo-Slavonic (Russian recension of Church Slavonic) as the principal literary language of the Serbs.

Around that time, laymen became more numerous and notable than monks and priests among active Serbian writers. The secular writers wanted their works to be closer to the general Serbian readership, but at the same time, most of them regarded Church Slavonic as more prestigious and elevated than the popular Serbian language. Church Slavonic was also identified with the Proto-Slavic language, and its use in literature was seen as the continuation of an ancient tradition. The writers began blending Russo-Slavonic, vernacular Serbian, and Russian, and the resulting mixed language is called Slavonic-Serbian. The first printed work in Slavonic-Serbian appeared in 1768, written by Zaharije Orfelin. Before that, a German–Slavonic-Serbian dictionary was composed in the 1730s. The blended language became dominant in secular Serbian literature and publications during the 1780s and 1790s. At the beginning of the 19th century, it was severely attacked by Vuk Karadžić and his followers, whose reformatory efforts formed modern literary Serbian based on the popular language. The last notable work in Slavonic-Serbian was published in 1825.

Slavonic-Serbian was used in literary works, including prose and poetry, school textbooks, philological and theological works, popular scientific and practical books, and other kinds of publications. Various laws, decisions, and proclamations by the Habsburg authorities were printed in Slavonic-Serbian, in which also the first Serbian newspapers, Serbskija novini, appeared in 1791. Other periodicals include Slaveno-serbskij Magazin (1768) and Slaveno-serbskija vědomosti (1792–94), as well as the later Novine serbske iz carstvujuščega grada Vienne (1814–1817). A bidirectional German–Serbian dictionary (1791), with around 20,000 headwords in each direction, was composed by adapting a German–Russian dictionary into Slavonic-Serbian.

Characteristics
Slavonic-Serbian texts exhibit lexical, phonological, morphological, and syntactical blending of Russo-Slavonic, vernacular Serbian, and, to a lesser degree, Russian; hybrid words are common. There are no definite rules determining how to combine elements from these languages. It mostly depends on the writer's linguistic attitude and the subject he writes about. So, in an Italian grammar written by Vikentije Ljuština, objects of everyday use are usually referred to by their Serbian names, while Russo-Slavonic names are used for religious holidays. During the short existence of Slavonic-Serbian, some forms became more or less standard, and the share of vernacular Serbian elements grew in it. Some authors argue that the application of Russo-Slavonic, Serbian, and Russian elements in a given work was regulated by stylistic conventions. In an individual sentence, the word stems or affixes could be either predominantly Serbian, or predominantly Russo-Slavonic, or combined in any other ratio. A sentence in the newspapers Slaveno-serbskija vědomosti, written by Stefan Novaković, is an example of elements from both languages being equally used, regarding both stems and affixes:

See also
 Outline of Slavic history and culture
 List of Slavic studies journals

Notes

References

External links

Serbian language
Extinct Slavic languages
Habsburg Serbs